Prostanthera albohirta is a species of flowering plant in the family Lamiaceae and is endemic to a restricted area of Queensland.  It is a small, erect, densely-foliaged shrub with egg-shaped leaves and hairy, lilac to lavender flowers arranged singly in four to twelve leaf axils near the ends of branchlets.

Description
The upper lip has two lobes fused with a small notch at the join. Flowering has been recorded in January.

Taxonomy
Prostanthera albohirta was first formally described in 1936 by Cyril Tenison White in the Proceedings of the Royal Society of Queensland from specimens collected on the "summit of Mount Demi, alt. 3,000 ft., on exposed cliff faces" by Leonard John Brass.

Distribution and habitat
Between 1932 and 2013, this mintbush was only known from Brass's single collection and attempts to collect further specimens failed. Then in 2013, the species was discovered on Mount Emerald near Tolga at elevations above . Only about fifty plants have been found, growing in a dense shrub layer in a protected gully dominated by stunted Syncarpia glomulifera.<ref name="Telopea2">{{cite journal |last1=Ford |first1=Andrew |last2=Conn |first2=Barry J. |title=Rediscovery of Prostanthera albohirta C.T.White (Lamiaceae). |journal=Telopea |date=3 October 2013 |volume=15 |pages=107–110 |doi=10.7751/telopea2013014}}</ref>

Conservation statusProstanthera albohirta is classified as "critically endangered" under the Australian Government Environment Protection and Biodiversity Conservation Act 1999'' and as "endangered" under the Queensland Government Nature Conservation Act 1992. The main threats to the species include inappropriate fire regimes, weed invasion, habitat loss caused by land clearing, and illegal collection.

References

albohirta
Flora of Queensland
Lamiales of Australia
Taxa named by Cyril Tenison White
Plants described in 1936
Endemic flora of Queensland